Night Doctors (also known as Night Riders, Night Witches, Ku Klux Doctors and Student Doctors) are bogeymen of African American folklore, with some factual basis. Body snatching from graves and enforced medical experimentation led to the development of African American folklore stories that told of doctors who would abduct, kill, and dissect bodies. The goal of these "Night Doctors" was to further prevent slaves, freedmen, and black workers from leaving for the Northern United States.

The term night doctors is often broadly used, referring to those who steal, buy, or practice on African American corpses to further their medical knowledge. At this time, the cadaver shortage among medical schools in the south led to people digging up their graves in the night to steal bodies, and slave owners selling their deceased to make some extra money. Grave robbing often happened in poor communities where they had no means to have or fund any deterrence of grave robbing or protection of their cemeteries. Night doctors preying on these marginalized communities were often overlooked by wealthier, more powerful people in the communities, and led to the fleeing of African Americans in the early to mid 20th century, now known as The Great Migration.

The African American community's distrust of the medical occupation and doctors predates the Tuskegee Syphilis Study, where doctors unethically withheld treatment from African Americans with the disease to use them as an experimental basis for untreated syphilis. When night doctors started emerging, the bodies of southern blacks were a valuable resource for dissection and autopsy studies in medical colleges. The horrors night doctors caused continued even after the American Civil War as they kept stealing African American bodies for dissection. Unethical practices against African Americans led to fear and distrust in the medical community.

Body snatching

Throughout the late 18th and early 19th centuries in the United States, the demand for cadavers exceeded the supply when hands-on dissection became popular in medical schools. The importance of human bodies in explaining general anatomy and fundamental methods like amputation has existed since ancient times. However, the need was intensified in the 19th century by the increased acceptability of dissecting human bodies. The necessity for dead bodies was met by grave-robbing and using slave bodies. The government put into place various countermeasures to deter grave robbers. However, these measures took time and money. Therefore, African American bodies were the most common ones to be robbed since they were legally, economically, and socially disadvantaged. Hence, the most frequent targets of grave robbers were African Americans, immigrants, and the impoverished. Grave robbers avoided stealing white American bodies because the dissection of white cadavers carried far greater risks for physicians. The bodies of African Americans were often sold to chattel for dissection by slave owners after their death. There is an overwhelming amount of evidence suggesting that the bodies of impoverished people, African Americans, and underprivileged individuals were used to improve the medical training of white elites. Grave robbers and their crimes were frequently overlooked by white Americans since grave robbing had no direct impact on them. The tales of night doctors, who bought and stole bodies, became part of African American history and traditions.

Body snatching increased during the post-revolutionary period because medical students started to perform dissections rather than simply observing professors. In the early 19th century, most states legislated against grave robbery. Even though grave robbing was formally prohibited, the penalty was comparatively light since grave robbing was considered misconduct rather than a felony. The punishment for grave robbing was a possible fine and a short period of imprisonment. Due to these permissive attitudes, relatives of the lately departed had to take it upon themselves to watch their loved ones' graves. Following this, grave robbery was very frequent even though there were laws prohibiting it in some states. Because of grave robbing, several riots took place between 1765 and 1852, the most well-known of which was New York Doctors' Riot of 1788. In the New York Doctors' riot of 1788, the unauthorized acquisition of bodies from the graves of the recently departed sparked a massive outburst of anger and dissatisfaction among impoverished people, specifically aimed at doctors and medical trainees. In January 1789, a year after the riot, a law was successfully passed that regulated the appropriate treatment of dead bodies, with heavy penalties inflicted on anyone who disobeyed the law. The Warburton Anatomy Act of 1832, which handed unclaimed remains to scientists and eventually ended grave robbery in Britain, was instrumental in enacting legislation in the United States that curtailed grave robbing. Massachusetts passed an identical, albeit less harshly worded, Anatomy Act of 1831, which legalized the use of dead bodies for dissection and anatomical studies. Most states soon passed similar legislation, and by the turn of the century, cadavers were almost entirely sourced from unclaimed remains.

An example of a medical college that used the bodies of African Americans, immigrants, and impoverished people is the Medical College of Georgia. Excavations at the Medical College of Georgia in 1989 yielded more than 9,000 bones. No records exist, and none of the remains have been identified, but it fits the inflammatory story to claim that they were mainly from working-class individuals and approximately 80% of those were African Americans. In addition to being the majority of cadavers, many teaching hospitals would only perform new live surgical techniques and demonstrations on African American patients. The consequences of employing the majority of African American bodies led to the dehumanization of African American people in the medical system, a lack of confidence between African American people and medical experts, and a reluctance among African American people to donate their bodies for medical purposes. The inordinate use of African American bodies for autopsy and medical studies unwittingly formed a view of black people as nothing more than medical experimentation material. The usage of African American bodies as experimental subjects has a long history in the United States, dating back to the use of Henrietta Lacks' cancer cells for research purposes without her proper consent to the Tuskegee Syphilis Study. In both of these instances, patients did not give consent to the medical projects and research being done on them. They were not informed and were blatantly misled. Medical injustice to people of color still remains, leaving a mistrust of the medical system throughout the country.

Needle Men and the Black Bottle Men
In New Orleans, Charity Hospitall (now the Medical Center of Louisiana at New Orleans) was a teaching hospital that needed cadavers for their students which is why they had a variation of Night Doctors called the "Needle Men." This hospital was known for many different racist incidents. In 1926, a sign prohibited black people to enter through the front door and forced these individuals to use the back door. The eponymous Needle Men would poke unsuspecting individuals in the arm, resulting in death. Several other explanations for these deaths were suggested, such as epilepsy. In 1924, there was a case where a man would poke women with a bayonet which resulted in their deaths. Ultimately, the substance in the needles caused people to die. From a quote taken from the collection of Louisiana Folk Tales, it's apparent that people were aware of what was going on at the time and feared being victim to the Needle Men.There were also students at Charity Hospital that were referred to as "Black Bottle Men." The black bottle would be a poison given upon entrance to Charity Hospital, and the patient would die shortly after drinking the black bottle.

It is now thought that the black bottle is referred to as cascara (Rhamnus purshiana) mixed with milk of magnesia, a laxative is commonly given to admitted patients of the era. It is unclear how a mild laxative could kill, but the myth continues that these bodies were used by medical students as cadavers for dissections.

Charity Hospital did not have sole responsibility for "Needle Men" or "Black Bottle Men." Johns Hopkins Hospital (the teaching hospital of Johns Hopkins University) was believed to be another source. From 1898 to 1904, the cadavers used by Johns Hopkins University were  African American which is highly disproportional to the surrounding population at the time. Personal anecdotes about these "Needle Men" or "Black Bottle Men" show their impact on the Black community. A woman from the book The Immortal Life of Henrietta Lacks states, "You'd be surprised how many people disappeared in East Baltimore when I was a girl. I'm telling you, I lived here in the fifties when they got Henrietta, and we weren't allowed to go anywhere near Hopkins. When it got dark and we were young, we had to be on the steps, or Hopkins might get us."

Even though Needle Men and Black Bottle Men are no longer around, they have had a lasting impact on the black communities surrounding the hospitals. There are still feelings of fear and distrust for medical professionals which can be detrimental to someone's health.

Modern day consequences 
Since African Americans arrived in the United States, they were marginalized and forced to be test subjects in various ways. Many white people believe that they still had a right to their bodies even after death. For many slaves, death was thought of as the one time their body may rest and they will suffer no more. With the Night Doctors digging up bodies that were already laid to rest, a great fear swept across the African American community. The studies that were done on African Americans in American history were often done without any consent. Today, this plays a great role because it has left African Americans distrusting and wary of the medical system which has wronged them in the past. It has exaggerated the racial divides between blacks and whites. Even today, neighborhoods between white people and African Americans are often separated, leading to separations in their access to medical care as well. The information gathered from the studies on black cadavers benefits people who have easy access to health care, such as wealthy, white communities, rather than the communities of marginalized people who were unethically used to obtain the information. African American communities tend to be underfunded, with less access to health care, education, insurance, and resources. African Americans are also less likely to seek out medical care for fear of what may be done to them against their will. There have been instances that African Americans are denied pain medication because they are perceived to be in less pain or faking it since they are taken less seriously among medical professionals. Night doctors left many modern-day repercussions on black communities in search of medical care.

References 

Bogeymen
Urban legends
American folklore
Fictional physicians
African-American culture